Narsarsuaq (lit. Great Plain; old spelling: Narssarssuaq) is a settlement in the Kujalleq municipality in southern Greenland. It had 123 inhabitants in 2020. There is a thriving tourism industry in and around Narsarsuaq, whose attractions include a great diversity of wildlife, gemstones, tours to glaciers, and an airfield museum.

History

Narsarsuaq is located within the Eastern Settlement of the Greenlandic Norse; the Brattahlíð farm of Erik the Red established in 985 was located on the opposite bank of Tunulliarfik Fjord, where the modern settlement of Qassiarsuk is situated.

In 1941 the United States built an air base at Narsarsuaq code-named Bluie West One (BW1). (Bluie was the Allied military code name for Greenland.) Thousands of planes used BW1 as a stepping stone on their way from the aircraft factories in North America to the battlegrounds of Europe. A 600-bed hospital was built in order to deal with casualties from the Normandy landings. After the end of the war, BW1 continued to be developed, and was a major hospital site during the Korean War, with the military hospital expanded to 1,000 beds. However,  it was rendered surplus by the advent of mid-air refueling and the construction of the larger Thule Air Base in northern Greenland. In 1951, it was agreed that Denmark and the United States would jointly oversee the airbase. Although it closed in 1958, it was reopened the following year by the Danish government after the loss of the vessel Hans Hedtoft and all crew south off Cape Farewell. The hospital was destroyed by a fire in 1972, although the ruins remain.

Transport 
Narsarsuaq Airport serves as the principal airfield in southwestern Greenland, with seasonal international flights from Iceland operated by Icelandair, feeding the commuter flights from communities of southern Greenland operated by Air Greenland. Small planes crossing the Atlantic sometimes replicate the North Atlantic Ferry Route, stopping at Narsarsuaq Airport and other World War II airfields, including Goose Bay, Newfoundland in Canada and Reykjavík in Iceland.

Narsarsuaq has a sea port where passenger boats and cruise ships can moor.

A  gravel road is maintained between Qassiarsuk and Narsarsuaq around the fjord. There is also a regular boat service to Qaqortoq.

Population 
The population of the settlement is strictly tied to the traffic dynamics at the local airport.

Climate
Narsarsuaq experiences boundary subarctic climate (Köppen: Dfc), which with a 0.8 °C (1.44 °F) margin escapes being classified as polar climate that is typical for the rest of Greenland. Despite its rather chilly temperatures, Narsarsuaq is one of the few places in Greenland with abundant naturally growing trees. This is due to several factors. Its geographical position is extremely sheltered from harsh subpolar winds by multiple layers of tall mountains to the west, and there is a heavy oceanic influence that results in a rather stable and steady amount of precipitation year-round. The oceanic influence can be observed in the occasional Atlantic storms that often pound the region (resulting in a fairly wet climate) and a moderate amount of precipitation per year (which could also be considered quite high by Greenlandic standards). 
Due to the fair climatic conditions, Narsarsuaq is the site of Greenland's only botanical garden, the "Greenlandic Arboretum".

Greenlandic Arboretum 

On the lower slopes of the Mellemlandet ridge, close to Narsarsuaq Airport, there is a unique 'botanical garden of the Arctic', called the Greenlandic Arboretum. The goal is to establish a live collection of trees and bushes native to both the arctic and the alpine tree-lines of the entire Northern Hemisphere.

Founded in 1988, it encompasses 15 hectares and it shelters 110 plant species, mostly varieties of boreal taiga trees, such as Siberian larch, lodgepole pine, white spruce, Sitka spruce, and various bushes. Many individual trees are tagged or otherwise marked. The plantation currently has more than 50,000 trees of various provenances.

References 

Populated places in Greenland